Rancho Chico is a census-designated place (CDP) in San Patricio County, Texas, United States. The population was 396 at the 2010 census.

Geography
Rancho Chico is located at  (28.027379, -97.497682).

According to the United States Census Bureau, the CDP has a total area of 0.5 square mile (1.3 km2), all land.

Demographics
As of the census of 2000, there were 309 people, 100 households, and 74 families residing in the CDP. The population density was 627.8 people per square mile (243.5/km2). There were 116 housing units at an average density of 235.7/sq mi (91.4/km2). The racial makeup of the CDP was 65.05% White, 2.91% African American, 25.57% from other races, and 6.47% from two or more races. Hispanic or Latino of any race were 88.03% of the population.

There were 100 households, out of which 36.0% had children under the age of 18 living with them, 50.0% were married couples living together, 17.0% had a female householder with no husband present, and 26.0% were non-families. 24.0% of all households were made up of individuals, and 7.0% had someone living alone who was 65 years of age or older. The average household size was 3.09 and the average family size was 3.73.

In the CDP, the population was spread out, with 32.0% under the age of 18, 8.7% from 18 to 24, 29.1% from 25 to 44, 19.1% from 45 to 64, and 11.0% who were 65 years of age or older. The median age was 33 years. For every 100 females, there were 111.6 males. For every 100 females age 18 and over, there were 112.1 males.

The median income for a household in the CDP was $21,111, and the median income for a family was $21,111. Males had a median income of $16,944 versus $40,125 for females. The per capita income for the CDP was $9,442. About 33.8% of families and 36.4% of the population were below the poverty line, including 63.0% of those under the age of eighteen and 18.6% of those 65 or over.

Education
Rancho Chico is served by the Sinton Independent School District.

References
https://instagram.com/rebecca75molinann6y?igshid=YmMyMTA2M2Y 

Census-designated places in San Patricio County, Texas 
Census-designated places in Texas 
Corpus Christi metropolitan area